Kim Yongjin is a South Korean politician. 

Other individuals with this name include:

 Kim Yong-jin (politician), North Korean government official, died in 2016
Kim Yong-jin (musician), member of South Korean band Bohemian (band)

Human name disambiguation pages